Martyn Day (born 26 March 1971) is a Scottish National Party (SNP) politician, who has served as the Member of Parliament (MP) for Linlithgow and East Falkirk since 2015. He has served as SNP Spokesperson for Health since December 2021.

Early life and education
Born in Falkirk, Martyn Day was brought up in Linlithgow and attended Linlithgow Academy. Prior to his political career, he worked for the Bank of Scotland as a personal banking manager.

Political career
He was first elected to West Lothian Council at the 1999 Scottish local elections representing the Linlithgow ward. From 2007–12 the SNP led the administration of West Lothian Council and Day held the portfolio of Development and Transport on the Council Executive, and served on over 40 committees and outside bodies. After the 2012 Scottish local elections, the SNP found themselves in opposition in West Lothian and Day took on the post of spokesperson for Development and Transport and group whip.

Day was selected to contest the Linlithgow and East Falkirk constituency at the 2015 general election, when he defeated the sitting Labour MP, Michael Connarty. He received 32,055 votes and a 52.0% share of the vote. He retained his seat at the 2017 snap election, but with a greatly reduced majority of 2,919 votes.

At the 2019 general election, Day was re-elected again, with an increased majority of 11,266 votes, with Charles Kennedy of the Conservatives finishing in second place.

References

External links

 Profile on SNP website
 Personal website

1971 births
Living people
Members of the Parliament of the United Kingdom for Scottish constituencies
People from Falkirk
People educated at Linlithgow Academy
Scottish National Party councillors
Scottish National Party MPs
UK MPs 2015–2017
UK MPs 2017–2019
UK MPs 2019–present
Bank of Scotland people